The Who's Tommy Orchestral is a live album by English rock singer Roger Daltrey, performing The Who's 1969 album Tommy alongside members of The Who touring band and a symphony orchestra conducted by Keith Levenson. It was recorded in July 2018 in Bethel, New York, at the site of the original Woodstock festival, during a US tour of the concert. Later, in February 2019, Levenson directed and recorded the Budapest Scoring Orchestra in Budapest with new arrangements from David Campbell, to add a new orchestral backing to the album.

The album was released by Polydor on 14 June 2019 to mark the 50th anniversary of the original recording, as a vinyl 2-LP set and a single CD. The track list presents the original studio album almost exactly, with the only changes being it missing "Underture", and a slightly different order. According to Daltrey "[the album is] played as a structured piece of music that is written and respected just as we respect the great composers of the past". The cover was designed by Richard Evans.

Track listing
All songs written by Pete Townshend, except where noted.

Charts

Personnel

Band
Roger Daltrey – vocals, producer
Simon Townshend – guitar, vocals
Frank Simes – guitar, background vocal
Jon Button – bass, background vocal
Loren Gold – keyboards, background vocal
Scott Devours – drums
David Campbell – arranger
Keith Levenson – conductor, producer
Budapest Scoring Orchestra – orchestra

Technical
Gareth Johnson – mixing
Richard Whittaker – mixing, additional production
Richard Evans – sleeve design
Andrew Bannister – label design

References

Tommy (rock opera)
2019 live albums
Roger Daltrey albums
Polydor Records live albums
Albums arranged by David Campbell (composer)